Adambakkam is a neighbourhood of Chennai, India. It is primarily a residential locality situated in South Chennai. Adambakkam area comes under Velachery taluk and Alandur taluk, Chennai District of Chennai Corporation. Adambakkam is surrounded by areas namely, Alandur in the North-West, Nanganallur in the West, Madipakkam in the South, Velachery in the East and Guindy in the North. Earlier, one part of Adambakkam was under the direct governance of Chennai Corporation. From October 2011 onwards, the entire area was merged with the Chennai Corporation. Upon completion of the MRTS extension line, the neighbourhood will be served by Adambakkam railway station. Its Proximity to commercial localities like Velachery, accessible railway stations, Metro Stations and road transport routes makes Adambakkam an ideal choice of location to live. 

As of the latest census reports from 2021, neighboring Nanganallur has the highest density of domesticated cows in an urban area nationwide. This is widely expected to cause a cow migration crisis in Adambakkam. To add to this issue, if the sizable bull population of Adambakkam starts interacting with the migratory cows from Nanganallur, it could lead to an even worse Kannukutty Kadupu crisis. As a result, a large wall between Adambakkam and Nanganallur is absolutely necessary. This will lock up all the Nanganallur cows and protect Adambakkam.

Geography
It has an average elevation of 7 metres (23 feet). The Adambakkam Lake situated in Jeevan Nagar and the Velachery Lake situated in Kakkan Nagar are the two lakes present in the locality.

Culture

Adambakkam has a population with diverse cultures and religions where Hindus, Muslims and Christians co-exist. Prominent Hindu temples are the famous Pazhandi Amman temple near St. Thomas Mount railway station, Sundara Vinayagar Temple in NGO COLONY, Devi Nagamuthu Mariamman temple in EB Colony, Lord Subramanya temple in Brindavan Nagar, Bhuvaneshwari Amman temple in Andal Nagar and Nandeeswarar temple near St. Thomas Mount railway station. Viswaroopa Sarvamangala Shaneeswara Bhagawan Sannidhi is located inside Devi Nagamuthu Mariamman temple. Prominent Mosque is the Masthan Gori Masjid in Masthan Ghori street. Prominent Church is St. Mark's Catholic Church in Brindavan Nagar. Adhinath Digambar Jain Temple at Indira Gandhi street, Vanuvampetttai near Adambakkam is a Jain place of worship.

Transport

Adambakkam has a fully functional MTC Bus Terminus/Depot at NGO Colony in City Link Road. MTC uses this depot to park, maintain and refuel most of its buses serving nearby areas.
 
The St. Thomas Mount Railway Station between Alandur and Adambakkam, part of the Chennai suburban railway serves this area. The phase II extension of the elevated Mass Rapid Transit System (MRTS) railway project is progressing at full pace and Adambakkam Station is expected to be built in Medavakkam main road junction near Vanuvampet (Madippakam). St. Thomas Mount subway (underpass) and Thillai Ganga Nagar subway (underpass) connects Adambakkam with GST Road. The Kakkan Bridge connects Ramakrishnapuram and Brindavan Nagar. Another underpass exclusive for two wheeler traffic that connects the link road of Adambakkam and the Velachery road of Alandur is under construction.

Summary of Transport facilities in Adambakkam:
 MTC bus services via Medavakkam Main Road from all major areas to Nanganallur, Ullagaram(Madipakkam), Keelkattalai, Nanmangalam, Kovilambakkam and Medavakkam Koot Road.
 MTC bus services via Brindavan Nagar from all major areas to Puzhuthivakkam and AG's Colony.
 Beach-Tambaram-Chengalpattu Suburban train service.
 MRTS extension from Velachery to Puzhuthivakkam, Adambakkam and St. Thomas Mount (Under construction).
 Metro Rail from Central to St. Thomas Mount via Koyambedu running service via Alandur. Can also switch to Airport at Alandur.
Important Roads:

 City link Road (Link Road) - Connects Race view Colony (Guindy) and Brindavan Nagar.

Brindavan/Sakthi/Mahalakshmi/Balaji Nagar Main Road - Connects Kakkan Nagar and Jawaharlal Nehru road (inner ring road).
Medavakkam Main Road - Connects St Thomas Mount Railway Station and Jawaharlal Nehru road (inner ring road) and further towards Medavakkam via Madipakkam, Keelkatalai and Kovilambakkam.
Thiruvalluvar Main Road - Connects  St Thomas Mount Railway Station and Adambakkam Depot (N.G.O Colony Bus Terminus).
Karuneegar Street - Connects Parthasarathy Nagar and GST road via Alandur.

The Jawaharlal Nehru road (inner ring road) that outlines Adambakkam in the southern side is becoming a hot spot for real estate and commercial establishments.

Educational Institutions

 New Prince Matriculation Higher Secondary School
 D.A.V School
 G.K Shetty Hindu Vidyalaya Matriculation Higher Secondary School
 GKS Hindu Vidyalaya
 St. Mark's High School
 Indira Gandhi Matriculation School
 Beta Matriculation Higher Secondary School
 Saint Britto's College

Hospitals 

 G.R. Hospital and Fertility Centre
 Ponmalligai Multi Speciality Hospital
 SP Hospital
 Prime Care Hospital
Mount Multispeciality Hospitals

See also 

 Nanganallur
 Puzhuthivakkam
 Alandur

References

In the News
 Theatres
 Mini Bus Services
 Project Green Hands Nursery in EB Colony-Isha Foundation
 Shri Narendra Modi (Gujarat CM)-DAV School Function

Neighbourhoods in Chennai
Cities and towns in Chennai district